Cembra Money Bank AG is a Swiss credit institution headquartered in Zurich-Altstetten. Cembra Money Bank operated under the name GE Money Bank until its IPO in early November 2013 and was part of the General Electric Group. Since November 2013, the credit institution has been listed on the Swiss stock exchange. Its main shareholders are currently Pictet, UBS Fund Management (Switzerland), and BlackRock Inc.

History 
Bank Prokredit was founded in 1912. In 1998, it came under the wing of GE Capital, which, the year before, had already acquired another Swiss consumer credit business, Bank Aufina, founded in 1953. It was not until 2006 that Prokredit, which had previously belonged to UBS, and Bank Aufina merged under the name GE Money Bank. In the summer of 2013, GE Money Bank was to be sold to the Aduno Group, but the transaction fell through at the last moment.
This was followed by the IPO as Cembra Money Bank in the fall of 2013. The successful IPO is considered the first major IPO on the Swiss stock exchange in a long time. The name Cembra is derived from the Latin name for the Swiss stone pine pinus cembra and symbolizes the brand values of Cembra Money Bank.
In 2019, Cembra Money Bank acquired cashgate AG from the Aduno Group.

Business areas 
Cembra Money Bank offers products in the personal loans, leasing, Credit cards, as well as savings market.
The credit institution covers the entire Swiss market and the Principality of Liechtenstein, as well as the neighboring countries. With the issuance of Migros' Cumulus Mastercard, Cembra Money Bank takes about 80 percent of the credit card business.
All of the bank's cards can be used with Apple Pay, Samsung Pay, Garmin Pay, Fitbit Pay, and SwatchPay! In the crowdlending market, Cembra has been cooperating with Postfinance's Lendico since 2018.

Management 
Holger Laubenthal is CEO and Felix Weber is chairman of the board of directors.

References 

Publicly traded companies
Banks based in Zürich
1990s establishments